Glenlee is a closed railway station on the Main South railway line in New South Wales, Australia. It was open between 1884 and 1947, and is now demolished with little trace remaining. North of the station site lies a triangle junction to the Glenlee colliery, the northern arm of which was electrified and served as the southern extent of electrification on the Main South line until it was cut back to Macarthur in the early 2000s.

References

Disused regional railway stations in New South Wales
Railway stations in Australia opened in 1884
Railway stations closed in 1947
Main Southern railway line, New South Wales